Sandy Beveridge (born December 9, 1981) is a Canadian former football defensive back who played eight seasons on special teams and as a defensive back for the Hamilton Tiger-Cats of the Canadian Football League. He was signed by the Tiger-Cats as an undrafted free agent in 2003. Beveridge announced his retirement on July 26, 2010 after he had accepted a firefighter position with the Hamilton Fire Department.

Beveridge played CIS football for the UBC Thunderbirds and worked with former Coquitlam Cheetahs track and field coach Percy Perry on developing his running.

References

External links
Hamilton Tiger-Cats bio

1981 births
Living people
Players of Canadian football from British Columbia
Canadian football defensive backs
UBC Thunderbirds football players
Hamilton Tiger-Cats players